Acochlidium is a genus of freshwater slugs, an aquatic gastropod molluscs in the family Acochlidiidae.

Acochlidium species have no shell.

Species
Species within the genus Acochlidium include:

 Acochlidium amboinense Strubell, 1892
 Acochlidium bayerfehlmanni Wawra, 1980
 Acochlidium fijiiensis Haynes & Kenchington, 1991

synonyms:
 Acochlidium paradoxum Strubell is a synonym for Strubellia paradoxa (Strubell, 1892)
 Acochlidium sutteri Wawra is a synonym for Palliohedyle sutteri
 Acochlidium weberi Bergh, 1896 is a synonym for Palliohedyle weberi

References

Acochlidiidae